3 lbs (pronounced "three pounds") is an American medical drama television series created by Peter Ocko, that aired on CBS from November 14, 2006 to November 7, 2008, replacing the cancelled series Smith. The show itself was then canceled three weeks later due to poor ratings.

The title refers to the fact that the average human brain weighs approximately three pounds. The show follows the medical careers of prominent brain surgeon Doctor Douglas Hanson (played by Stanley Tucci) and his protégé, Jonathan Seger.

The show was promoted as "the next great medical drama." The theme song is "Calling All Angels" by Train. Eight episodes were made, and the five episodes that did not originally air in the United States are available on Amazon Prime.

The program filmed in New York City at the request of Tucci, who did not want to be away from home to make the series.

When the pilot was originally filmed Dylan McDermott played Dr. Doug Hanson, and Reiko Aylesworth played Dr. Adrienne Holland.

Main cast
 Stanley Tucci as Dr. Douglas Hanson
 Mark Feuerstein as Dr. Jonathan Seger
 Indira Varma as Dr. Adrienne Holland
 Armando Riesco as Dr. Thomas Flores
 Zabryna Guevara as Melania Ortiz
 Griffin Dunne as Jeffrey Coles
 Juliette Goglia as Erica Lund
 Tamara Taylor as Della

Episodes

References

External links
 
 

2000s American drama television series
2000s American medical television series
2006 American television series debuts
2007 American television series endings
CBS original programming
English-language television shows
Television series by CBS Studios
Television shows set in New York City
Television shows filmed in New York City